The Chiusella is a  long river in the Piedmont region of Italy.

Geography 

The Chiusella starts in the Graian Alps near Mount Marzo and Bocchetta delle Oche, a mountain pass connecting its valley with Val Soana. 
Flowing initially from NW to SE it reaches Traversella and the permanently inhabited part of the valley. In the territory of Issiglio it receives from the right side the waters of Torrente Savenca, its main tributary. The Chiusella is then blocked by a dam forming the Lake Gurzia. Flowing eastwards it forms a canyon and leaves the mountains entering the plain; near Strambino it finally flows into the Dora Baltea.

Tributaries 
Left hand tributaries:
 torrente Dondogna;
 torrente Tarva;
 torrente Bersella;
 rio Quaglia;
 rio Ribes (formerly Ri Bes).
Right hand tributaries:
 rio Sportore;
 rio Ricordone;
 rio Trueisa;
 torrente Savenca.

The bridges on the Chiusella

References

Other projects

Rivers of the Province of Turin
Rivers of the Alps
Rivers of Italy